Petrels are tube-nosed seabirds in  the bird order Procellariiformes.

Description
The common name does not indicate relationship beyond that point, as "petrels" occur in three of the four families within that group (all except the albatross family, Diomedeidae). Having a fossil record that was assumed to extend back at least 60 million years, the Procellariiformes was long considered to be among the older bird groupings, other than the ratites, with presumably distant ties to penguins and loons. However, recent research and fossil finds such as Vegavis show that the Galliformes (pheasants, grouse and relatives), and Anseriformes (ducks, geese) are still not fully resolved.

Known species
All the members of the order are exclusively pelagic in distribution—returning to land only to breed.

The family Procellariidae is the main radiation of medium-sized true petrels, characterised by united nostrils with medium septum, and a long outer functional primary feather. It is dominant in the Southern Oceans, but not so in the Northern Hemisphere.

It includes a number of petrel groups, the relationships between which have finally been resolved to satisfaction.
 The fulmarine petrels: seven species of surface predators and filter feeders, breed in high latitudes but migrate along cool currents to the north. All but Fulmarus are essentially confined to the south, Fulmarus apparently colonised the Northern Hemisphere during the Early Miocene.
 The huge giant petrels, genus Macronectes, which are convergent with the albatrosses
 The true fulmars, genus Fulmarus
 Antarctic petrel Thalassoica antarctica
 Cape petrel Daption capense
 Snow petrel Pagodroma nivea
 The prions: A specialised group of a few very numerous species, all southern. They have a small, fulmar-like form and mostly filter-feed on zooplankton.
 Pachyptila, the prions proper
 The procellariine petrels, larger or mid-sized species feeding on fish and molluscs which are fairly close to the prions:
 Procellaria
 Bulweria
 Shearwaters: There are numerous species in several genera with a medium number of species.
 Calonectris
 Puffinus, which is two rather distinct groups of larger and smaller species
 Pseudobulweria
 Kerguelen petrel Lugensa brevirostris
 The gadfly petrels: These are a considerable number of agile short-billed petrels in the genus Pterodroma which include the endangered Bermuda petrel or cahow and a considerable number of forms rendered extinct by human activity.

The families Oceanitidae and Hydrobatidae are the storm petrels, small pelagic petrels with a fluttering flight which often follow ships.

The family Pelecanoididae is the four species of diving petrels, genus Pelacanoides. These are auk-like small petrels of the southern oceans.

The word petrel (first recorded in that spelling 1703) comes from earlier (ca. 1670) pitteral; the English explorer William Dampier wrote the bird was so called from its way of flying with its feet just skimming the surface of the water, recalling Saint Peter's walk on the sea of Galilee (Matthew xiv.28); if so, it likely was formed in English as a diminutive of Peter (< Old  (?) > Late  < Late  <  <  = "stone").

See also

Skua
Agreement on the Conservation of Albatrosses and Petrels

References

External links

Petrel and shearwater videos on the Internet Bird Collection
Agreement on the Conservation of Albatrosses and Petrels (ACAP)


Procellariiformes
Seabirds
 
Bird common names